Robert Lopez (born February 23, 1975) is an American songwriter for musicals, best known for co-creating The Book of Mormon and Avenue Q, and for co-writing the songs featured in the Disney computer-animated films Frozen, its sequel Frozen II, and Coco, with his wife Kristen Anderson-Lopez. He is one of only eighteen people who have won an Emmy, a Grammy, an Oscar and a Tony Award, nicknamed by Philip Michael Thomas in 1984 as the "EGOT". He additionally holds the distinctions of being the youngest person to win an EGOT, and winning the awards across the shortest period of time: he won all four in the span of ten years and completed the set at the age of 39. He is also the only person to have won all four awards more than once, having won two Oscars, three Tonys, three Grammys, and four Emmys.

Early life
Robert Lopez was born in Manhattan, to Katherine (Lowe) and Frank Lopez. He is partly of Filipino descent through his father (who was born on a ship in the middle of the ocean after departing Manila); his paternal grandfather was Filipino, and his paternal grandmother was of half Filipino and half Scottish-American descent (both originally resided in Manila).  His father was director of publications for NYU Langone Medical Center.

Lopez spent much of his childhood in Greenwich Village, except for one year in Massachusetts while his father was working for Clark University.  Upon their return to New York City when he was six years old, "it was a fluke" that he started piano lessons at Greenwich House Music School. The apartment they were subletting at the time happened to have a piano; his mother asked if he was interested in taking lessons, and he said yes. At age seven, his parents bought a piano for him, he saw his first Broadway show, and he wrote his first song. At age 11, he wrote his first opening number.  At around age 12, he briefly moved away from the piano and tried playing the saxophone, as well as taking courses in musical composition at other music schools.

Lopez went on to Hunter College High School and then to Yale University where he graduated in 1997 with a Bachelor of Arts degree in English (the type of academic degree expressly discussed in the second song of Avenue Q). While at Yale, he wrote three plays (of which two were musicals) and was a member of the Yale Spizzwinks(?) a cappella group, and was influenced by professors such as Vincent Scully, John Hollander and Harold Bloom.  During his time at Yale, he vaguely hoped to make a living writing musicals and "had no [other] career options"; towards that end, he avoided courses that would prepare him for a career in something more secure like law or medicine.

Career

1998-2004: Early work and breakthrough 

Upon graduating from Yale, Lopez moved back in with his parents and brother in Greenwich Village, where he lived for four years until he was able to earn enough money writing songs for Theatreworks USA to rent an apartment of his own. During this period, he took temporary jobs at companies like Pfizer and worked as a weekend receptionist for his old music school, Greenwich House.

In 1998, while participating in the BMI Lehman Engel Musical Theater Workshop, he met another aspiring songwriter, Jeff Marx. Their first project together, Kermit, Prince of Denmark, a Muppet parody of Hamlet, won the Kleban Award for lyrics, though The Jim Henson Company rejected the script, saying it did not have enough "kid appeal." The story was considered for the next Muppet film by Chris Curtin in 2004, until Curtin left the Disney Company. Highlights from the unproduced musical were performed by Rick Lyon, Rebecca Jones, and Susan Blackwell at the BMI Workshop.

In 1999, Lopez and Marx, who collaborated on both music and lyrics, began work on Avenue Q, a stage musical which, using puppet characters, similar to those on Sesame Street, dealt with adult themes and ideas. The show, for which Lopez also provided the animated segments, was his first professional experience. After playing Off-Broadway, the show transferred in July 2003 to Broadway's John Golden Theatre, where it proved both a critical and popular success, winning the 2004 Tony Award for Best Musical, and earning Lopez and Marx the Tony Award for Best Original Score.  The Original Cast Recording was nominated for a Grammy Award in 2004.

2005–2011: Career stardom 
In 2005, Lopez began working on a new musical project with his musical partner Jeff Marx, and with Matt Stone and Trey Parker, the creators of South Park, a series which, in 2003, Lopez had mentioned as a partial inspiration for Avenue Q. The Book of Mormon premiered on Broadway at the Eugene O'Neill Theatre on March 24, 2011, following previews from February 24. The show received numerous theater awards, including the 2011 Tony for Best Musical, as well as two more Tony Awards for Lopez: Best Original Score and Best Book of a Musical.  The production's original cast recording also earned Lopez the 2012 Grammy Award for Best Musical Theater Album.

In early 2006, Lopez collaborated with his brother, Billy, on several episodes of the Nickelodeon series Wonder Pets, for which they shared a Daytime Emmy award with the series' other composers and music director, Jeffrey Lesser, in 2008.  In January 2007, a musical adaptation of the Disney/Pixar film Finding Nemo, which Lopez co-wrote with his wife, Kristen Anderson-Lopez, opened at Disney's Animal Kingdom theme park.

On January 18, 2007, Lopez and Marx again collaborated to write four of the songs for the hit TV show Scrubs on the show's 123rd episode titled "My Musical." TV Guide named the episode one of the best 100 TV show episodes of all time in 2009. Lopez, along with Jeff Marx, was recognized with an Emmy nomination for the song "Everything Comes Down to Poo" from the above-mentioned episode.  Stephanie D'Abruzzo, who originated the roles of Kate Monster and Lucy the Slut in Avenue Q, guest-starred in the episode.

In April 2010, Lopez wrote the song "Bet Against the American Dream," which was featured on the NPR program This American Life. The song was written in the style of a Broadway show tune, and parodied a scene from the musical The Producers to illustrate the story of a real-life hedge fund called Magnetar that made millions of dollars when the housing market collapsed. On June 25, 2010, Lopez won his second Daytime Creative Arts Emmy for Outstanding Achievement in Music Direction and Composition for his work on The Wonder Pets! In 2011, Lopez again worked with Matt Stone and Trey Parker on the South Park episode "Broadway Bro Down.”

Lopez also co-wrote two songs for the Disney Channel animated series Phineas and Ferb: "Aerial Area Rug," for the episode "Magic Carpet Ride," and "Fly On the Wall," for the episode of the same name. Lopez composed a song for The Simpsons episode "A Totally Fun Thing That Bart Will Never Do Again" titled "Enjoy It While You Can" which aired on April 29, 2012.

2011–present: Continued success 
Lopez and his wife Kristen Anderson-Lopez wrote seven songs for Winnie the Pooh, released in 2011 by Walt Disney Animation Studios. They also wrote an original song for Wreck-It Ralph that was cut from the finished film.

In 2013, Lopez and Anderson-Lopez wrote songs for Disney Animation's feature film Frozen. The song "Let It Go" won the Academy Award for Best Original Song, making Lopez the 12th person to achieve the EGOT. On February 8, 2015, they won another Grammy for their work on Frozen for the Grammy Award for Best Song Written for Visual Media for "Let It Go".

In development for several years by Lopez and Anderson-Lopez, their romantic-comedy musical Up Here debuted August 9, 2015, at the La Jolla Playhouse in San Diego. Lopez describes Up Here as "It's kind of like Annie Hall meets Cirque du Soleil. It's a romantic comedy with a huge theatrical twist."

Lopez and his wife wrote the musical number "Moving Pictures" for the 87th Academy Awards.

It was announced in late 2015 that Lopez would be writing original songs for the revival of the cult comedy series Mystery Science Theater 3000.

Lopez and his wife were attached to write the music for the Disney film Gigantic, an animated retelling of "Jack and the Beanstalk", but the film was shelved in October 2017.

The Disney/Pixar film Coco, released in November 2017, features Lopez and Anderson-Lopez's song "Remember Me". The song won the 2018 Academy Award for Best Original Song, making Lopez the first double EGOT winner. Most recently, Lopez and Anderson-Lopez composed the theme music from the MCU show WandaVision, which premiered on Disney+ on January 15, 2021.

Personal life

During his participation in the 1999 BMI Lehman Engel Musical Theatre Workshop, Robert Lopez met and began dating lyricist Kristen Anderson. As described in a 2003 The New York Times profile, the pair, struggling in a cash-strapped post-college period that recalls the storyline of Avenue Qs Princeton and Kate Monster, "live[d] in Astoria, Queens, [drove] a 1989 Buick and survive[d] on fast food".

The couple married in 2003 and their two daughters, Katie and Annie, had voice parts in Frozen, with Katie voicing 5-year-old Anna and Annie voicing a troll. They currently reside in the Park Slope neighborhood of Brooklyn.

Work

Film

Television

Theatre

Awards and nominations

References

External links
 
 

American musical theatre composers
American musical theatre lyricists
American people of Filipino descent
American people of Scottish descent
Broadway composers and lyricists
People from Greenwich Village
1976 births
Living people
Hunter College High School alumni
Grammy Award winners
Tony Award winners
Walt Disney Animation Studios people
Yale University alumni
Annie Award winners
Best Original Song Academy Award-winning songwriters
Daytime Emmy Award winners
Primetime Emmy Award winners
Songwriters from New York (state)
Drama Desk Award winners
Animation composers